The 2018–19 Regional Four Day Competition was the 53rd edition of the Regional Four Day Competition, the domestic first-class cricket competition for the countries of the Cricket West Indies (CWI). The competition started on 6 December 2018 and concluded on 17 March 2019. Six teams contested the tournament – Barbados, Guyana, Jamaica, the Leeward Islands, Trinidad and Tobago, and the Windward Islands. Guyana were the defending champions. The players' draft for the tournament took place in May 2018.

Ahead of the final round of fixtures, Guyana had a 23-point lead over their nearest rivals, the Leeward Islands, with the Leeward Islands needing to score the maximum of 24 points in their last game to win the tournament. Guyana were confirmed as champions, after the Leeward Islands were bowled out for 90 runs in the first innings of their final match. The Leeward Islands would then go on to declare their second innings on 83/2, still 18 runs behind Barbados, and therefore lose the match. This was in an attempt to finish ahead of Barbados in the final table, but with a miscalculation on the points required, the Leeward Islands finished 0.2 points behind Barbados.

Squads
Prior to the start of the tournament, the following squads were selected in the Professional Cricket League draft:

Points table

 Champions

Fixtures

Round 1

Round 2

Round 3

Round 4

Round 5

Round 6

Round 7

Round 8

Round 9

Round 10

Round 11

References

External links
 Series home at ESPN Cricinfo

2018 in West Indian cricket
2019 in West Indian cricket
Regional Four Day Competition seasons
Regional Four Day Competition